Rajasthan Pharmacy College (RPC) is an institute run under the aegis of Chandrawati Education Society, which has been in the field of education since 2000. The society is registered with the Registrar of Societies, Government of N.C.T. Delhi vide registration No. S.35514 of 1999, under the Societies Registration Act of 1860 with the aim of providing quality technical education. Rajasthan Pharmacy College was established in 2006 in affiliation with the All India Council for Technical Education (AICTE) and governed by the Rajasthan University of Health Sciences and approved by Pharmacy Council of India, with an emphasis on providing course of study and preparing trained manpower in the field of pharmacy.

The society established its first institution, Rajasthan Institute of Engineering and Technology (RIET, Jaipur), in 2000, with the approval of All India Council for Technical Education (AICTE), Ministry of Education, and government of India.

The society established Rajasthan College of Engineering for Women (RCEW, Jaipur) in 2002 and Rajasthan Institute of Engineering and Technology (RIET, Chittorgarh) in 2006.

Academics

RPC offers a 4 year Bachelor of Pharmacy (B. Pharma) and a 2 year Master of Pharmacy (M. Pharma). Admissions to the institute are through the Rajasthan Centralized Admissions to Pharmacy Degree (B.Pharm) & Diploma (D.Pharm) Courses 2011 (RCA Pharmacy 2011)  and Management Quota.

RPC, Jaipur is a wireless institute, with wired as well as wireless networks linking the entire campus.

Departments

•  Pharmaceutics

•  Pharma chemistry

•  Pharmacognosy

•  Pharmacology

•  Pharmaceutical Analysis

Academic Programs

Communities

RPC Alumni Association

RPC Alumni Association exists to promote and facilitate lifelong links between the college and its alumni community. Membership is automatic to all who have studied in the college.

Parent Management Association (PMA)

Parents play an important role in life at the college. Rajasthan Pharmacy College Parent Management Association (PMA) encourages support for and interest in the college and its pupils. The PMA provides parents, guardians and teachers with a forum to discuss matters of mutual interest and concern. The PMA also lends practical assistance to the college and liaises with the Board on College matters. Membership of the Association is open to all parents and guardians of pupils as well as to all teaching staff.

A Management Committee is elected annually in May. Two Parent Managers are elected to the Board by the parents at an Annual General Meeting. Parents serve for a term of three years while they have students attending the college.

See also
 Rajasthan Institute of Engineering and Technology
 Rajasthan College of Engineering for Women

References

External links
 

Pharmacy schools in India
Universities and colleges in Jaipur
Educational institutions established in 2006
2006 establishments in Rajasthan